The greater pewee (Contopus pertinax) is a passerine and is in the tyrant flycatcher group. This species' range is further north than the other Mexican species. This bird was formerly known as Coues' flycatcher.

Description
This species is slightly longer than the olive-sided flycatcher. The adult greater pewee is the largest breeding Contopus flycatcher to breed in the U.S. It is a dull gray-brown bird all over with some birds that have a buff wash on the breast. They have indistinct wingbars and a very distinct crest. The lower mandible is bright orange and that is an easy way to distinguish them from olive-sided flycatchers in eastern Arizona and west central New Mexico.

Behavior
These birds love to stay high in trees scanning for insects. They sally and hawk insects from their high perches. The greater pewee defends its nesting grounds aggressively. They will attack hawks, jays and squirrels. Their diet consists of insects and maybe berries in cooler months. The opening  is repeated several times before the rest of the song. It also gives  calls like the olive-sided flycatcher.

Habitat
The greater pewee prefers montane pine forests with an oak understory. Also found in montane deciduous especially Arizona sycamore forests and mixed montane oak-pine forest. They are found more easily in elevations over 6,500 feet in Arizona and New Mexico. They are rare in western Texas.

Range
The greater pewee is found year-round in central and southern Mexico south through Costa Rica and Nicaragua. It breeds from central Mexico north to southeast and central Arizona and southwest New Mexico. Rarely does it reach southern California, southern Nevada or western Texas.

Nesting
The female builds the nest high in a horizontal fork of a conifer. The nest is compact and attached by cobwebs. It is made of grass and weeds and is decorated with lichen. The nest is usually lined with fine grasses. The female lays three or four creamy white eggs sparsely marked with or wreathed with browns and olive.

References

Contopus
Birds of the United States
Birds of Mexico
Birds of Belize
Birds of El Salvador
Birds of Guatemala
Birds of Honduras
Birds of Nicaragua
Birds of Central America
Birds described in 1859